The Migration of the Angel (Georgian: Angelozis gadaprena ანგელოზის გადაფრენა) is a 2001 Georgian film directed by Nodar Managadze. It was Georgia's submission to the 74th Academy Awards for the Academy Award for Best Foreign Language Film, but was not accepted as a nominee.

See also
Cinema of Georgia
List of Georgian submissions for the Academy Award for Best Foreign Language Film
List of submissions to the 74th Academy Awards for Best Foreign Language Film

References

External links

2001 films
2001 drama films
2000s Georgian-language films
Drama films from Georgia (country)